The Hungarian German Bloc (BMG) was a political alliance in Romania.

History
The alliance was formed by the Magyar Party and the German Party in order to contest the 1927 general elections. It received 6% of the vote, winning fifteen seats in the Chamber of Deputies and one in the Senate, emerging as the third-largest bloc in Parliament.

Electoral history

Legislative elections

References

Defunct political party alliances in Romania
Hungarian organizations in Romania
German organizations in Romania
Hungarian political parties in Romania
German diaspora political parties